This a list of extant freshwater fish that could be found in Spain. The majority of the fish present are from the order Cypriniformes. This list states if the fish are native or introduced. For clarification, an endemic species is a species that is found only in a specific geographic region. IUCN status represents the extinction risk for each species and the fish found in Spain range from least concern to critically endangered.

Notes:

*- denotes fish that did not have a common name listed on fishbase.

**- denotes fish that did not have a common name listed on fishbase, but had a local name listed

References 

 Acipenser ruthenus (Siberian sturgeon)
 Acipenser stellatus (star sturgeon)
 Acipenser transmontanus (white sturgeon)
 Acipenser sturio (European sturgeon)

Further reading

 
 
 
 
 
 
 
 

Spain